The 2014–15 season is Hyderabad cricket team's 81st competitive season. The Hyderabad cricket team and Hyderabad women's cricket team are senior men's and women's domestic cricket teams based in the city of Hyderabad, India, run by the Hyderabad Cricket Association. They represent the state of Telangana in domestic competitions.

Competition Overview

Senior Men's team

Squads
 Head coach: Abdul Azeem
 Assistant coach : Noel David
 Fielding Coach : NS Ganesh

Duleep Trophy
Pragyan Ojha, Dwaraka Ravi Teja and Hanuma Vihari got selected for South Zone squad for 2014-15 Duleep Trophy, a first-class cricket tournament in India.

Deodhar Trophy
Ashish Reddy got selected for South Zone squad for 2014-15 Deodhar Trophy, a List A cricket competition in India.

Irani Cup
Pragyan Ojha got selected for Rest of India squad for 2014-15 Irani Cup, a first-class cricket competition in India.

Indian Premier League
Local franchise, Sunrisers Hyderabad retained Ashish Reddy and Chama Milind and picked Hanuma Vihari while Mumbai Indians picked Pragyan Ojha in the IPL Auction for 2015 Indian Premier League season.

Vijay Hazare Trophy

Hyderabad began their campaign in Vijay Hazare Trophy, a List A cricket tournament in India, against Tamil Nadu at Hyderabad on 7 November 2014. They finished in sixth in South Zone with a win and four losses.

Points Table
South Zone

Matches
Zonal Stage

Statistics
Most runs

 Source: Cricinfo
Most wickets

 Source: Cricinfo

Ranji Trophy

Hyderabad began their campaign in Ranji Trophy, the premier first-class cricket tournament in India, against Andhra at Visakhapatnam on 7 December 2014. They finished fifth in Group C with a win, six draws and a loss.

Points Table
Group C

Matches
Group Stage

Statistics
Most runs

 Source: Cricinfo
Most wickets

 Source: Cricinfo

Syed Mushtaq Ali Trophy

Hyderabad began their campaign in Syed Mushtaq Ali Trophy, a Twenty20 tournament in India, against Tamil Nadu at Kochi on 25 March 2015. Ashish Reddy took the hat-trick in their final zonal match against Goa. They finished inside top-2 in South Zone with three wins and two losses to advance to Super League. They finish fifth in Super League with a win and three losses.

Points Table

South Zone

Super League Group B

Matches
Zonal Stage

Super League Group Stage

Statistics
Most runs

 Source: Cricinfo
Most wickets

 Source: Cricinfo

Senior Women's team

Squads
 Head coach: Abdul Bari Wahab 
 Physio : Harini Balachander

Senior women's cricket inter zonal two day game
Sneha Morey, Ananya Upendran, Vellore Mahesh Kavya and M Shalini got selected for South Zone squad for 2015-16 Senior women's cricket inter zonal three day game, a maiden Women's First-class cricket tournament in India.

One-Day League
Hyderabad began their campaign in Senior women's one day league, Women's List A cricket tournament in India, against Bengal at Rajkot on 6 December 2014. They finished fifth in Elite Group A with a win and three losses.

Points Table
Elite Group A

 Top two teams advanced to Super League.

Matches
Group Stage

Statistics
Most runs

 Source: BCCI
Most wickets

 Source: BCCI

T20 League
Hyderabad began their campaign in Senior Women's T20 League, a Women's Twenty20 cricket tournament in India, against Kerala at Mumbai on 11 January 2015. They finished in fourth in Elite Group B with a win and three losses.

Points Table
Elite Group B

 Top two teams advanced to Super League. 
 Bottom team relegated to 2015-16 Plate Group.

Matches
Group Stage

Statistics
Most runs

 Source: BCCI
Most wickets

 Source: BCCI

See also
 Hyderabad cricket team
 Hyderabad women's cricket team
 Hyderabad Cricket Association

References

External links
Hyderabad cricket team official site

Cricket in Hyderabad, India
Cricket in Telangana
Sport in Telangana